Sandra Kottman (born 20 May 1967) is a Dutch former cricketer. She played 32 Women's One Day International matches for the Netherlands women's national cricket team. She was part of the Netherlands squad for the 1997 and 2000 Women's Cricket World Cup

References

External links
 

1967 births
Living people
Dutch women cricketers
Netherlands women One Day International cricketers
Sportspeople from Haarlem